The Varvara reservoir is a reservoir near Mingachevir, Azerbaijan.

Overview 
It was built in 1952 to manage the water flow of
the daily outflow of water from Mingachevir reservoir discharging into Kura river, in order to produce electricity.

Hydroelectric power station 
A 16,500 kilowatt hydroelectric power station with 3 turbines is a part of the reservoir complex.

See also 
 Rivers and lakes in Azerbaijan

References 

Reservoirs in Azerbaijan
Reservoirs built in the Soviet Union
Yevlakh District